The Italian film industry produced over two hundred feature films in 2014. This article fully lists all non-pornographic films, including short films, that had a release date in that year and which were at least partly made by Italy. It does not include films first released in previous years that had release dates in 2014.  Also included is an overview of the major events in Italian film, including film festivals and awards ceremonies, as well as lists of those films that have been particularly well received, both critically and financially.

Major Releases

Notable Deaths

See also

 2014 in film
 2014 in Italy
 2014 in Italian television
 Cinema of Italy
 List of Italian submissions for the Academy Award for Best Foreign Language Film

References

External links

Italian
2014
Films